The Channel Islands' Co-operative Society is a long-established consumer co-operative with stores in the Channel Islands. Its head office is located in Saint Helier in Jersey.

In the year ending 13 January 2019, Channel Islands Co-op recorded sales of £183.6m (£174.5m 2017/18) and a profit after tax of £940k (£745k 2017/18). The Society was able to pay its members a 4% dividend (4% 2017/18) as a share of profits, with the total reported member benefits amounting to £7.97m, inclusive of Dividend, Dividend stamps, travel vouchers and share interest. The Society had a £5.8m (£6.8m 2017/18) pension deficit. Society membership was 128,350 in 2019, slightly up on the 126,751 figure in 2018.

History

The Jersey Co-operative Society was formed in 1919 and the Guernsey Co-operative Society followed in 1947. Both predecessors were supported by a CWS supervisory committee, which meant their accounts were liable to UK taxation. Growing objection to this persuaded the CWS to propose a merger which led to the incorporation of the Channel Islands' Society in 1955.

In August 2013, it was announced that the company's two Channel Island Homemaker warehouses would be closed, and replaced with a single warehouse in the UK.

Activities

The society operates twelve grocery stores in Jersey and ten in Guernsey, the largest of which are called Grand Marche, the stores with a petrol forecourt trade as En Route and the convenience stores trading as Locale, all of which charge the same retail prices. In addition the society operates Travelmaker, funeral care, member services through its post office network, 'Pharmacy Locale and Medical Care businesses. Membership is open to all residents of the Channel Islands when they open a share account for £1, with members receiving a share of the profits in the form of dividends.

The Channel Islands' Co-operative Society is a UK-registered industrial and provident society, a member of the Co-operative Union in the United Kingdom, the Co-operative Retail Trading Group, the Co-operative Travel Trading Group and a corporate member of The Co-operative Group (formerly Co-operative Wholesale Society), the largest consumer co-operative in the world.

See also

 British co-operative movement
 Credit unions in the United Kingdom

References

External links
 The Channel Islands Co-operative Society

Retail companies established in 1919
Business services companies established in 1919
Companies of the Channel Islands
1919 establishments in Jersey
Food retailers of Jersey
Furniture retailers of Jersey
Co-operatives in the United Kingdom
Consumers' cooperatives